The 2020 Michigan Democratic presidential primary took place on March 10, 2020, as one of several states voting the week after Super Tuesday in the Democratic Party primaries for the 2020 presidential election. The Michigan primary was an open primary, with the state awarding 147 delegates towards the 2020 Democratic National Convention, of which 125 were pledged delegates allocated on the basis of the results of the primary.

Former vice president Joe Biden decisively won the primary and every county in the state, getting almost 53% of the vote and 73 delegates. Senator Bernie Sanders received around 36% of the vote and 52 delegates, marking a clear regression in support for him from 2016, when he edged out Hillary Clinton by 1.42% and won 73 of the state's 83 counties. Biden's victory was powered by support from African Americans, older voters, working class voters, and moderate voters.

Procedure
Michigan was one of six states (along with Democrats Abroad) which held primaries on March 10, 2020, one week after Super Tuesday. Voting took place throughout the state from 7:00 a.m. until 8:00 p.m. local time. In the open primary, candidates had to meet a threshold of 15 percent at the congressional district or statewide level in order to be considered viable. The 125 pledged delegates to the 2020 Democratic National Convention were allocated proportionally on the basis of the results of the primary. Of these, between 4 and 9 were allocated to each of the state's 14 congressional districts and another 16 were allocated to party leaders and elected officials (PLEO delegates), in addition to 27 at-large delegates. The March primary as part of Stage I on the primary timetable received no bonus delegates, in order to disperse the primaries between more different date clusters and keep too many states from hoarding on a March date.

After district conventions on May 16, 2020, during which district-level delegates were selected, the state central committee meeting subsequently was held on June 13, 2020, to vote on the 27 at-large and 16 pledged PLEO delegates for the Democratic National Convention. The delegation also included 22 unpledged PLEO delegates: 12 members of the Democratic National Committee, 9 members of Congress (both senators and 7 representatives), and the governor Gretchen Whitmer.

Candidates
The following people have been included on the list issued by the Michigan Secretary of State for the presidential primary.

Running

Joe Biden
Tulsi Gabbard
Bernie Sanders

Withdrawn

Michael Bennet
Michael Bloomberg
Cory Booker
Pete Buttigieg
Julian Castro
John Delaney
Amy Klobuchar
Joe Sestak
Tom Steyer
Elizabeth Warren
Marianne Williamson
Andrew Yang

There was also an uncommitted option on the ballot.

Polling

Results

See also 
2020 Michigan Republican presidential primary

Notes
Additional candidates

References

External links
Official primary results from the Michigan Secretary of State
The Green Papers delegate allocation summary
Michigan Democratic Party delegate selection plan
FiveThirtyEight Michigan primary poll tracker

Michigan Democratic
Democratic primary
2020